QUCHIC (BB-22, SGT-32 or 1-(cyclohexylmethyl)-1H-indole-3-carboxylic acid 8-quinolinyl ester) is a designer drug offered by online vendors as a cannabimimetic agent, and was first detected being sold in synthetic cannabis products in Japan in early 2013, and subsequently also in New Zealand. The structure of QUCHIC appears to use an understanding of structure-activity relationships within the indole class of cannabimimetics, although its design origins are unclear. QUCHIC, along with QUPIC, represents a structurally unique synthetic cannabinoid chemotype since it contains an ester linker at the indole 3-position rather than the precedented ketone of JWH-018 and its analogues, or the amide of SDB-001 and its analogues.

Pharmacology
BB-22 acts as a full agonist with a binding affinity of 0.217nM at CB1 and 0.338nM at CB2 cannabinoid receptors.

See also 
 5F-PB-22
 JWH-018
 PB-22
 QUPIC
 SDB-001
 SDB-005

References 

Cannabinoids
Designer drugs
Indoles
Indolecarboxylates